Anthony Phillip "Tony" Duran (14 October 1945, Los Angeles, California, USA − 19 December 2011, Bruceville, Texas, USA) was an American slide guitarist and singer. From 1972 he was member of Frank Zappa's backing band and he was also member of Ruben and the Jets. In 1963 he graduated in Garfield High School.

Tony Duran died on December 19, 2011 at his home in Bruceville, Texas after a two year battle with prostate cancer.

Discography
This section isn't complete.

With Frank Zappa
 Waka/Jawaka (1972)
 The Grand Wazoo (1972)
 Apostrophe (') (1974)
 Joe's Domage (2004)
 Imaginary Diseases (2006) − live album
 Zappa Wazoo (2007) − live album
 One Shot Deal (2008) − live album
 Little Dots (2016) - live album

With Ruben and the Jets
 For Real! (1973)
 Con Safos (1974)

References

Deaths from prostate cancer
1945 births
2011 deaths
American rock guitarists
American male guitarists
American rock singers
Slide guitarists
20th-century American guitarists
People from McLennan County, Texas
20th-century American male singers
20th-century American singers